Auchincruive railway station was a railway station serving the settlement of St Quivox and the estate of Auchincruive, South Ayrshire, Scotland. The station was originally part of the Ayr to Mauchline Branch of the Glasgow and South Western Railway.


History 
The station opened on 1 September 1870,  The station was part of the Ayr to Mauchline Branch of the Glasgow and South Western Railway. It became part of the London Midland and Scottish Railway during the Grouping of 1923. Passing on to the Scottish Region of British Railways during the nationalisation of 1948 who closed the station to regular passenger services on 10 September 1951.

The site today
Today the Ayr to Mauchline line is still open as a freight line.

References

Notes

Sources 
 
 
 
 Station on navigable O.S. map (disused station near St Quivox)

Disused railway stations in South Ayrshire
Railway stations in Great Britain opened in 1870
Railway stations in Great Britain closed in 1951
Former Glasgow and South Western Railway stations